The women's singles tournament of the 2019 BWF World Championships (World Badminton Championships) took place from 19 to 25 August. The Badminton World Federation has conducted a re-draw of the women's singles event in 9 August, because a player had mistakenly been included in the entry list.

Seeds 

The seeding list is based on the World Rankings from 30 July 2019.

  Akane Yamaguchi (second round)
  Tai Tzu-ying (quarterfinals)
  Nozomi Okuhara (final)
  Chen Yufei (semifinals)
  P. V. Sindhu (world champion)
  He Bingjiao (quarterfinals)
  Ratchanok Intanon (semifinals)
  Saina Nehwal (third round)

  Zhang Beiwen (third round)
  Sung Ji-hyun (third round)
  Michelle Li (third round)
  Mia Blichfeldt (quarterfinals)
  Han Yue (third round)
  Gregoria Mariska Tunjung (third round)
  Line Kjærsfeldt (second round)
  Cai Yanyan (second round)

Draw

Finals

Top half

Section 1

Section 2

Bottom half

Section 3

Section 4

References

2019 BWF World Championships